Bang Bang is an Albanian TV channel for children aged 1–14. It was launched on 17 December 2004 by the TV platform DigitAlb. All of Bang Bang's programming is in Albanian, which can be switchable to the original language (of dubbing) on the second audio track. The channel also has a rating system, which is divided into three groups; babies 1–5 years old, kids 6–9 years old, and teenagers 11–14 years old.

Çufo is its main sister channel, sharing its dubs and promos about upcoming content with each other. Many dubs that have aired on Çufo in the past currently air on Bang Bang or vice versa.

Programming

Programs

Bang Bang airs several cartoon and live-action series from around the world dubbed into Albanian, along with some Albanian originals mostly made by DigitAlb. The dubbings are provided by "Jess" Discographic, AA Film Company, NGS Recording, Top Channel, Albatrade Studio, and Albania Production (Unison).

Logo history
The first logo that Bang Bang used (2004-2006) was a train in which the engine has letter B and the carriages saying ANG BANG. The second logo (2006-2007) is blue coloured splash saying BANG BANG in it. Another logo (2007-2009) are 8 different coloured splashes which in each splash is one letter ex. B is the first splash, A is the second. The last (2009–present) are 8 letters coloured yellow and the channel has got its own mascot, a monkey which is formed with the channel's letters.

See also
 DigitAlb
 Television in Albania

References

External links
Official website
Channel and transponder list

Digitalb television networks
Mass media in Tirana
Television channels and stations established in 2004